Simhah is a Hebrew word that means gladness, or joy, and is often used as a given name. Related names include Simha, Simcha, and Simchah. Notable people with the name include:

Nahman Ben Simhah of Bratslav (1772–1810), the founder of the Breslov Hasidic movement
Simhah b. Samuel of Speyer (13th century), German rabbi and tosafist
Simhah ben Samuel of Vitry, (died 1105), French Talmudist of the 11th and 12th centuries
Simhah of Rome, Jewish scholar and rabbi who lived in Rome in the last quarter of the thirteenth century AD
Simhah Pinsker (1801–1864), Polish-Jewish scholar and archeologist born at Tarnopol, Galicia
Simhah Reuben Edelmann (1821–1892), Russian grammarian and commentator
Solomon b. Simhah Dob Mandelkern (1846–1902), Ukrainian Jewish poet and author

See also
Jayasimha (disambiguation)
Samhah
Sima Hui